was a Japanese scholar and diplomat of the Asuka period. The Takamuko clan are descended from Cao Pi.

Karumauro traveled to China with Ono no Imoko as kenzuishi representing Empress Suiko in 608. He remained in China for thirty-two years.  Following his return in 640, he was awarded the title Kuni no hakase (国博士, "National Scholar").  Karumauro helped write the Taika Reforms in 645.  He was sent again as an ambassador to China (kentōshi). Takamuko died upon his arrival in Chang'an in 654.

See Also

Notes

References
 Nussbaum, Louis Frédéric and Käthe Roth. (2005). Japan Encyclopedia. Cambridge: Harvard University Press. ; OCLC 48943301
Sansom, George (1961). A History of Japan: 1334–1615. Stanford, California: Stanford University Press.

654 deaths
Kuge
Year of birth unknown
Japanese ambassadors to the Tang dynasty